Harrimaniidae is a basal family of acorn worms. A taxonomic revision was undertaken in 2010, and a number of new genera and species found in the Eastern Pacific were described. In this family the development is direct without tornaria larva, and circular muscle fibers in their trunk is missing. There is some indication that Stereobalanus may be a separate basal acorn worm lineage, sister to all remaining acorn worms.

Species
The following genera and species are listed in the World Register of Marine Species:

Harrimania Ritter, 1900
Harrimania kupfferi (von Willemoes-Suhm, 1871)
Harrimania maculosa Ritter, 1900
Harrimania planktophilus Cameron, 2002
Horstia Deland, Cameron, Rao, Ritter & Bullock, 2010
Horstia kincaidi Deland, Cameron, Rao, Ritter & Bullock, 2010
Meioglossus Worsaae, Sterrer, Kaul-Strehlow, Hay-Schmidt & Giribet, 2012
Meioglossus psammophilus Worsaae, Sterrer, Kaul-Strehlow, Hay-Schmidt & Giribet, 2012
Mesoglossus Deland, Cameron, Rao, Ritter & Bullock, 2010
Mesoglossus bournei (Menon, 1904)
Mesoglossus caraibicus (van der Horst, 1924)
Mesoglossus gurneyi (Robinson, 1927)
Mesoglossus intermedius Deland, Cameron, Rao, Ritter & Bullock, 2010
Mesoglossus macginitiei Deland, Cameron, Rao, Ritter & Bullock, 2010
Mesoglossus pygmaeus (Hinrichs & Jacobi, 1938)
Protoglossus van der Horst, 1935
Protoglossus graveolens Giray and King, 1996
Protoglossus koehleri (Caullery and Mesnil, 1900)
Protoglossus taeniatum author unknown
Ritteria Deland, Cameron, Rao, Ritter & Bullock, 2010
Ritteria ambigua Deland, Cameron, Rao, Ritter & Bullock, 2010
Saccoglossus Schimkewitsch, 1892
Saccoglossus apatensis Thomas, 1956
Saccoglossus aulakoeis Thomas, 1968
Saccoglossus borealis Okuda & Yamada, 1955
Saccoglossus bournei (Menon, 1904)
Saccoglossus bromophenolosus King, Giray and Kornfield, 1994
Saccoglossus caraibicus (van der Horst, 1924)
Saccoglossus gurneyi (Robinson, 1927)
Saccoglossus horsti Brambell and Goodhart, 1941
Saccoglossus hwangtauensis Si & Kwang-Chung, 1935
Saccoglossus inhacensis van der Horst, 1934
Saccoglossus kowalevskii (Agassiz, 1873)
Saccoglossus madrasensis Rao, 1957
Saccoglossus mereschkowskii (Wagner, 1885)
Saccoglossus otagoensis (Benham, 1899)
Saccoglossus pusillus (Ritter, 1902)
Saccoglossus pygmaeus Hinrichs and Jacobi, 1938
Saccoglossus ruber Tattersall, 1905
Saccoglossus sulcatus (Spengel, 1893)
Stereobalanus Spengel, 1901
Stereobalanus canadensis (Spengel, 1893)
Stereobalanus willeyi Ritter, 1904
Xenopleura Gilchrist, 1925
Xenopleura vivipara Gilchrist, 1925

References

Enteropneusta
Articles containing video clips